Spinomantis fimbriatus is a species of frog in the Mantellid subfamily Mantellinae, endemic to Madagascar.

Taxonomy
This species was described in the genus Mantidactylus, subgenus Spinomantis, by Glaw & Vences in 1994.

Habitat and distribution
The species is endemic to Madagascar. It has been recorded from Andasibe in eastern Madagascar, north to Masoala, Anjanaharibe and Marojejy in northeastern Madagascar. Its natural habitats are pristine subtropical or tropical moist lowland forests at elevations of 500–1,000 m.

Conservation
While S. fimbriatus is currently classified as Least Concern by the IUCN due to its abundant populations throughout its range, the species is likely under some pressure from loss of its forest habitat to agriculture, settlements, and timber and charcoal production, and the spread of invasive plants like eucalyptus.

References

Endemic fauna of Madagascar
Amphibians described in 1994
Taxonomy articles created by Polbot